The Maupin Carbon Dragon is an American, high-wing, single-seat, glider that was designed by Jim Maupin and made available as plans for amateur construction. Plans are no longer available.

Design and development
The designer said "The philosophy behind its development was to try to bring foot launch soaring performance up into the lower performance range of sailplanes." The Carbon Dragon was intended to be similar in concept to the Hall Vector 1.

The original design was intended to be a much more complex aircraft, as Maupin explained:

As a result, the aircraft was redesigned to its final configuration, a simpler and lighter aircraft with a  span wing.

The Carbon Dragon is predominantly a conventional wood and doped aircraft fabric glider, making judicious use of carbon fiber in the wing spar caps, control rods, flaperons and the elliptical tail boom to save weight. The control tubes are constructed by laying up the carbon fiber on aluminium tubing and then, when the carbon has cured, dissolving the aluminium with swimming pool acid. The main aircraft structure consists of dual triangular torque boxes on each side of the fuselage. The wing employs a Culver SD airfoil that was designed by Irv Culver for the project and full-span flaperons of 30% chord. The flaperons can deploy from −5° to +15° as flaps and −4° to +16° as ailerons, with a 4:1 differential. The flaperons are driven by two, vertically mounted pushrods enclosed within the fuselage and connected to the side stick. The wing ribs forward of the spar are fabricated from  5-ply mahogany and aft of the spar from  square spruce. The landing gear is a fixed monowheel, mounted on the hinged cockpit bottom door, that opens to allow the pilot to lift the aircraft for foot-launching. The aircraft was designed so that if the pilot falls while foot-launching his body will be in the rear fuselage cavity and not pinned under the aircraft. The ultimate structural load limit is +/-7.5 g, with a +/-5.0 g operational load limit.

The Carbon Dragon was designed to be launched by foot-launch, aero-tow, winch-launch, auto-tow or bungee launch.

In October 1988 Maupin estimated that building a Carbon Dragon would cost US$2000 and take 1000–1500 hours of construction time.

When they were available the plans consisted of 23 sheets of 2' X 4' (61 X 122 cm) blueprints and sold for US$150.

At least one Carbon Dragon was modified to include a cockpit roof-mounted pentagonal spoiler, similar to that used on the Maupin Windrose.

Operational history
Many of the early test flights were done near Tehachapi, California by auto-tow using a  rope and these included several 45-minute soaring flights in evening convergent lift. The designer conducted many of the prototype flights himself and said of flying the aircraft, "It's great fun to fly, everything happens so slowly".

In October 1988 Maupin stated that 70 sets of plans had been sold.

Qualifying as a FAR Part 103 hang glider, the Carbon Dragon does not require FAA registration and thus an accurate number of the total completed is not available, but the Soaring Directory reports four have been flown.

Variants

Carbon Dragon
Initial version
Magic Dragon
Improved version developed by Steve Arndt

Specifications (Carbon Dragon)

See also

References

External links
Carbon Dragon Technical Website
Carbon Dragon Archive (2012)

1980s United States sailplanes
Sailplanes designed for foot-launching
Homebuilt aircraft
Aircraft first flown in 1988
High-wing aircraft